This article lists some of the events from 1950 related to the Netherlands.

Incumbents
Monarch: Juliana
Prime Minister: Willem Drees

Events
April: Princess Beatrix, the Queen's daughter, enters the Incrementum at Baarnsch Lyceum to continue her education.

Sports
 1950–51 Netherlands Football League Championship
 1950 Dutch Grand Prix
 1950 Dutch TT

Births
22 February: Lenny Kuhr, singer-songwriter
4 May: Magda Berndsen, politician and police officer 
18 June: Heddy Lester, singer and actress
17 July: Derek de Lint, actor
16 December: Roy Schuiten, cyclist (d. 2006)

Deaths
23 April: Franciscus Janssens, 76th General Abbot of the Common Observance

References

 

 
1950 by country
1950s in the Netherlands
1950 in Europe